Niermala Badrising (born 4 July 1962) is a Surinamese diplomat and politician. She was Minister of Foreign Affairs of Suriname in the cabinet of President Dési Bouterse between 12 August 2015 and 1 February 2017. She has been ambassador to the United States since July 2017.

Early life and education
Badrising was born on 4 July 1962 in Paramaribo. In 1987 Badrising obtained a master's degree in International Studies from the International Institute of Social Studies in The Hague, Netherlands. In 2007 she obtained a master's degree in International Relations and Diplomacy from the Fletcher School of Law and Diplomacy of Tufts University in the United States. She also has a licentiate degree in law from the Anton de Kom University of Suriname, where she specialized in international labor law and international relations.

Career
Badrising started working for the Ministry of Foreign Affairs in 1989. She kept working there until 1996, which included a term as Head of the United Section at the Department of International Organizations. Between 1998 and 2012 Badrising worked as senior advisor and chief coordinator at the Office of the President of Suriname.

In November 2011 Badrising was appointed as Permanent Representative of Suriname to the Organization of American States, with co-accreditations to the Inter-American Development Bank and Worldbank. She assumed her position in January 2012.

On 13 August 2015 she took over the position of Minister of Foreign Affairs from Winston Lackin. On 1 February 2017 she was replaced as Minister by Yldiz Pollack-Beighle. The Surinamese government subsequently proposed her as the ambassador to the United States. She started working as ambassador on 9 June of the same year, and offered her diplomatic credentials to President Donald Trump on 21 July 2017. She left the position in 2021.

See also
List of foreign ministers in 2017

References

1964 births
Living people
21st-century women politicians
Ambassadors of Suriname to the United States
Anton de Kom University of Suriname alumni
Female foreign ministers
Foreign ministers of Suriname
International Institute of Social Studies alumni
People from Paramaribo
Surinamese women diplomats
The Fletcher School at Tufts University alumni
Women government ministers of Suriname
Women ambassadors
Surinamese women in politics